Jeffrey Scott Buckley (November 17, 1966 – May 29, 1997), raised as Scott Moorhead, was an American singer, songwriter, and guitarist. After a decade as a session guitarist in Los Angeles, Buckley amassed a following in the early 1990s by performing cover songs at venues in East Village, Manhattan, such as Sin-é, while gradually focusing more on his own material. After rebuffing interest from record labels and Herb Cohen—the manager of his father, singer Tim Buckley— he signed with Columbia, recruited a band, and recorded what would be his only studio album, Grace, in 1994.

Over the following three years, the band toured extensively to promote Grace, including concerts in the U.S., Europe, Japan, and Australia. In 1996, they stopped touring and made sporadic attempts to record Buckley's second album in New York City with Tom Verlaine as the producer.

In 1997, Buckley moved to Memphis, Tennessee, to resume work on the album, to be titled My Sweetheart the Drunk, recording many four-track demos while also playing weekly solo shows at a local venue. On May 29, 1997, while awaiting the arrival of his band from New York, he drowned during a spontaneous evening swim, fully clothed, in the Mississippi River, where he was caught in the wake of a passing boat; his body was found on June 4.

Since his death, there have been many posthumous releases of his material, including a four-track collection of demos and studio recordings of his unfinished second album My Sweetheart the Drunk, expansions of Grace, and the Live at Sin-é EP. Chart success for Buckley came posthumously; with his cover of Leonard Cohen's "Hallelujah", Buckley attained his first number one on Billboards Hot Digital Songs in March 2008 and reached number two in the UK Singles Chart that December. Rolling Stone included Grace in its list of the 500 Greatest Albums of All Time and included Buckley in their list of the greatest singers.

Early life
Born in Anaheim, California, Buckley was the only son of Mary ( Guibert) and Tim Buckley. His mother was a Zonian of mixed Greek, French, and Panamanian descent, while his father was the son of an Irish American father and an Italian American mother. Buckley was raised by his mother and stepfather, Ron Moorhead, in Southern California, and had a half-brother, Corey Moorhead. Buckley moved many times in and around Orange County while growing up, an upbringing Buckley called "rootless trailer trash". As a child, Buckley was known as Scott "Scottie" Moorhead, based on his middle name and his stepfather's surname.

His biological father, Tim Buckley, was a singer-songwriter who released a series of folk and jazz albums in the late 1960s and early 1970s, and whom, he said, he only met once, at the age of eight. After his biological father died of a drug overdose in 1975, he chose to go by Buckley and his real first name, which he found on his birth certificate. To members of his family he remained "Scottie".

Buckley was brought up around music; his mother was a classically trained pianist and cellist, and his stepfather introduced him to Led Zeppelin, Queen, Jimi Hendrix, the Who, and Pink Floyd at an early age. Led Zeppelin's Physical Graffiti was the first album he owned, and he has noted hard rock band Kiss as an early favorite. He grew up singing around the house and in harmony with his mother, and later noted that all his family sang. He began playing guitar at the age of five after discovering an acoustic guitar in his grandmother's closet. At age 12, he decided to become a musician and received his first electric guitar, a black Les Paul, at age 13. He attended Loara High School and played in the school jazz band; during this time, he developed an affinity for progressive rock bands Rush, Genesis, and Yes, as well as jazz fusion guitarist Al Di Meola.

After graduating high school, he moved to Hollywood to attend the Musicians Institute, completing a one-year course at age 19. Buckley later told Rolling Stone the school was "the biggest waste of time", but noted in an interview with DoubleTake Magazine that he appreciated studying music theory there, saying, "I was attracted to really interesting harmonies, stuff that I would hear in Ravel, Ellington, Bartók."

Career
Buckley spent the next six years working in a hotel and playing guitar in various struggling bands, playing in styles from jazz, reggae, and roots rock to heavy metal. He toured with dancehall reggae artist Shinehead and also played the occasional funk and R&B studio session, collaborating with fledgling producer Michael J. Clouse to form X-Factor Productions. Throughout this period, Buckley limited his singing to backing vocals.

He moved to New York City in February 1990 but found few opportunities to work as a musician. He was introduced to Qawwali, the Sufi devotional music of India and Pakistan, and Nusrat Fateh Ali Khan, one of its best-known singers. Buckley was an impassioned fan of Khan, and during what he called his "cafe days", he often covered Khan's songs. In January 1996, he interviewed Khan for Interview and wrote liner notes for Khan's Supreme Collection, Vol. 1 compilation. He also became interested in blues musician Robert Johnson and hardcore punk band Bad Brains during this time. Buckley moved back to Los Angeles in September when his father's former manager, Herb Cohen, offered to help him record his first demo of original songs. Buckley completed Babylon Dungeon Sessions, a four-song cassette that included the songs "Eternal Life", "Unforgiven" (later titled "Last Goodbye"), "Strawberry Street" (a different version of which appears on the Grace Legacy Edition), and punk screamer "Radio". Cohen and Buckley hoped to attract attention from the music industry with the demo tape.

Buckley flew back to New York early the following year to make his public singing debut at a tribute concert for his father called "Greetings from Tim Buckley". The event, produced by show business veteran Hal Willner, was held at St. Ann's Church in Brooklyn on April 26, 1991. Buckley rejected the idea of the concert as a springboard to his career, instead citing personal reasons regarding his decision to sing at the tribute.

With accompaniment by experimental rock guitarist Gary Lucas, Buckley performed "I Never Asked To Be Your Mountain", a song Tim Buckley wrote about an infant Jeff Buckley and his mother. Buckley returned to the stage to play "Sefronia – The King's Chain", "Phantasmagoria in Two", and concluded the concert with "Once I Was" performed acoustically with an impromptu a cappella ending, due to a snapped guitar string. Willner, the show's organizer, later recalled that Buckley's set closer made a strong impression. Buckley's performance at the concert was counterintuitive to his desire to distance himself musically from his father; Buckley later explained his reasoning to Rolling Stone: "It wasn't my work, it wasn't my life. But it bothered me that I hadn't been to his funeral, that I'd never been able to tell him anything. I used that show to pay my last respects." The concert proved to be his first step into the music industry that had eluded him for years.

On subsequent trips to New York in mid-1991, Buckley began co-writing with Gary Lucas, resulting in the songs "Grace" and "Mojo Pin", and by late 1991, he began performing with Lucas's band Gods and Monsters in New York City. After being offered a development deal as a member of Gods and Monsters at Imago Records, Buckley moved to Lower East Side, Manhattan, at the end of 1991. The day after Gods and Monsters officially debuted in March 1992, he decided to leave the band.

Buckley began performing at several clubs and cafés around Lower Manhattan, but Sin-é became his main venue. He first appeared at Sin-é in April 1992 and quickly earned a regular Monday night slot there. His repertoire consisted of a diverse range of folk, rock, R&B, blues, and jazz cover songs, much of it he had newly learned. During this period, he discovered singers such as Nina Simone, Billie Holiday, Van Morrison, and Judy Garland. Buckley performed an eclectic selection of covers from a range of artists from Led Zeppelin, Nusrat Fateh Ali Khan, Bob Dylan, Édith Piaf, Elton John, the Smiths, Bad Brains, Leonard Cohen, Robert Johnson and Siouxsie Sioux. Original songs from the Babylon Dungeon Sessions, and the songs he'd written with Gary Lucas were also included in his set lists. He performed solo, accompanying himself on a borrowed Fender Telecaster. Buckley stated he learned how to perform onstage from playing to small audiences.

Over the next few months, Buckley attracted admiring crowds and attention from record label executives, including industry maven Clive Davis dropping by to see him. By the summer of 1992, limos from executives eager to sign the singer lined the street outside Sin-é. Buckley signed with Columbia Records, home of Bob Dylan and Bruce Springsteen, for a three-album, nearly  deal in October 1992. Buckley spent three days in February 1993 in the studio with engineer Steve Addabbo and Columbia A&R representative, Steve Berkowitz, recording much of Buckley's solo repertoire. Buckley sang a cappella and accompanied himself on acoustic and electric guitars, Wurlitzer electric piano, and harmonium. These tapes remain unreleased in the Columbia vaults, but much of this material later surfaced on the Grace album. Recording dates were set for July and August 1993 for what would become Buckley's recording debut, an EP of four songs which included a cover of Van Morrison's "The Way Young Lovers Do". Live at Sin-é was released on November 23, 1993, documenting this period of Buckley's life.

Grace

In mid-1993, Buckley began working on his first album with record producer Andy Wallace. Buckley assembled a band, composed of bassist Mick Grøndahl and drummer Matt Johnson, and spent several weeks rehearsing.

In September, the trio headed to Bearsville Studios in Woodstock, New York, to spend six weeks recording basic tracks for what would become Grace. Buckley invited ex-bandmate Lucas to play guitar on the songs "Grace" and "Mojo Pin", and Woodstock-based jazz musician Karl Berger wrote and conducted string arrangements with Buckley assisting at times. Buckley returned home for overdubbing at studios in Manhattan and New Jersey, where he performed take after take to capture the perfect vocals and experimented with ideas for additional instruments and added textures to the songs.

In January 1994, Buckley departed on his first solo North American tour in support of Live at Sin-é, followed by a 10-day European tour in March. Buckley played clubs and coffeehouses and made in-store appearances. After returning, Buckley invited guitarist Michael Tighe to join the band and a collaboration between the two resulted in "So Real", a song recorded with producer/engineer Clif Norrell as a late addition to the album. In June, Buckley began his first full band tour called the "Peyote Radio Theatre Tour" that lasted into August. The Pretenders' Chrissie Hynde, Soundgarden's Chris Cornell, and The Edge from U2 were among the attendees of these early shows.

Grace was released on August 23, 1994. In addition to seven original songs, the album included three covers: "Lilac Wine", based on the version by Nina Simone; made famous by Elkie Brooks, "Corpus Christi Carol", from Benjamin Britten's A Boy was Born, Op.3, a composition that Buckley was introduced to in high school, based on a 15th-century hymn; and "Hallelujah" by Leonard Cohen, based on John Cale's recording from the Cohen tribute album, I'm Your Fan. His rendition of "Hallelujah" has been called "Buckley's best" and "one of the great songs" by Time, and is included on Happy Mag's list of "The 10 Best Covers Of All Time", and Rolling Stones list of "The 500 Greatest Songs of All Time".

Sales of Grace were slow, and it garnered little radio airplay despite critical acclaim. The Sydney Morning Herald proclaimed it "a romantic masterpiece" and a "pivotal, defining work". Despite slow initial sales, the album went gold in France and Australia over the next two years, achieved gold status in the U.S. in 2002, and sold over six times platinum in Australia in 2006.

Grace won appreciation from a host of revered musicians and artists, including members of Buckley's biggest influence, Led Zeppelin. Jimmy Page considered Grace close to being his "favorite album of the decade". Robert Plant was also complimentary, as was Brad Pitt, saying of Buckley's work, "There's an undercurrent to his music, there's something you can't pinpoint. Like the best of films, or the best of art, there's something going on underneath, and there's a truth there. And I find his stuff absolutely haunting. It just ... it's under my skin." Others who had influenced Buckley's music lauded him: Bob Dylan named Buckley "one of the great songwriters of this decade", and, in an interview with The Village Voice, David Bowie named Grace as one of 10 albums he'd bring with him to a desert island.

Concert tours
Buckley spent much of the next year and a half touring internationally to promote Grace. Following Buckley's Peyote Radio Theater tour, the band began a European tour on August 23, 1994, starting with performances in the UK and Ireland. The tour continued in Scandinavia and, throughout September, numerous concerts in Germany were played. The tour ended on September 22 with a concert in Paris. A gig on September 24 in New York dovetailed on to the end of the European tour and Buckley and band spent the next month relaxing and rehearsing.

A tour of Canada and the U.S. began on October 19, 1994, at CBGB's. The tour was far reaching with concerts held on both East and West Coasts of the U.S. and a number of performances in central and southern states. The tour ended two months later on December 18 at Maxwell's in Hoboken, New Jersey. After another month of rest and rehearsal, the band commenced a second European tour, this time mainly for promotion purposes. The band began the tour in Dublin. The short tour largely consisted of promotional work in London and Paris.

In late January, the band did their first tour of Japan, playing concerts and appearing for promotion of the album and newly released Japanese single "Last Goodbye". The band returned to Europe on February 6 and toured various Western European countries before returning to the U.S. on March 6. Among the gigs performed during this period, Buckley and his band performed at a 19th-century-built French venue, the Bataclan, and material from the concert was recorded and later released in October of that year as a four track EP, Live from the Bataclan. Songs from a performance on February 25, at the venue Nighttown in Rotterdam, were released as a promotional-only CD, So Real.

Touring recommenced in April with dates across the U.S. and Canada. During this period, Buckley and the band notably played Metro in Chicago, which was recorded on video and later released as Live in Chicago on VHS and later on DVD. In addition, on June 4 they played at Sony Music Studios for the Sony Music radio hour. Following this was a month-long European tour between June 20 and July 18 in which they played many summer music festivals, including the Glastonbury Festival and the 1995 Meltdown Festival (at which Buckley sang Henry Purcell's "Dido's Lament" at the invitation of Elvis Costello). During the tour, Buckley played two concerts at the Paris Olympia, a venue made famous by the French vocalist Édith Piaf. Although he had failed to fill out smaller American venues at that point of his career, both nights at the large Paris Olympia venue were sold out. Shortly after this Buckley attended the Festival de la Musique Sacrée (Festival of Sacred Music), also held in France, and performed "What Will You Say" as a duet with Alim Qasimov, an Azerbaijani mugham singer. Sony BMG has since released a live album, 2001's Live à L'Olympia, which has a selection of songs from both Olympia performances and the collaboration with Qasimov.

Buckley's Mystery White Boy tour, playing concerts in both Sydney and Melbourne, Australia, lasted between August 28 and September 6 and recordings of these performances were compiled and released on the live album Mystery White Boy. Buckley was so well received during these concerts that his album Grace went gold in Australia, selling over 35,000 copies, and taking this into account he decided a longer tour was needed and returned for a tour of New Zealand and Australia in February the following year.

Between the two Oceanian tours, Buckley and the band took a break from touring. Buckley played solo in the meantime with concerts at Sin-é and a New Year's Eve concert at Mercury Lounge in New York. After the break, the band spent the majority of February on the Hard Luck Tour in Australia and New Zealand, but tensions had risen between the group and drummer Matt Johnson. The concert on March 1, 1996, was the last gig he played with Buckley and his band.

Much of the material from the tours of 1995 and 1996 was recorded and released on either promotional EPs, such as the Grace EP, or posthumously on albums, such as Mystery White Boy (a reference to Buckley not using his real name) and Live à L'Olympia. Many of the other concerts Buckley played during this period have surfaced on bootleg recordings.

Following Johnson's departure, the band, now without a drummer, was put on hold and did not perform live again until February 12, 1997. Due to the pressure from extensive touring, Buckley spent the majority of the year away from the stage. However, from May 2 to 5, he played a short stint as bass guitarist with Mind Science of the Mind, with friend Nathan Larson, then guitarist of Shudder to Think. Buckley returned to playing live concerts when he went on his "phantom solo tour" of cafés in the Northeast U.S. in December 1996, appearing under a series of aliases: the Crackrobats, Possessed by Elves, Father Demo, Smackrobiotic, the Halfspeeds, Crit-Club, Topless America, Martha & the Nicotines, and A Puppet Show Named Julio. By way of justification, Buckley posted a note stating he missed the anonymity of playing in cafes and local bars:

My Sweetheart the Drunk 

In 1996, Buckley started writing a new album with the working title My Sweetheart the Drunk. While working with Patti Smith on her 1996 album Gone Again, he met collaborator Tom Verlaine, the lead singer of the punk band Television. Buckley asked Verlaine to be producer on the new album and he agreed. In mid-1996, Buckley and his band began recording sessions in Manhattan with Verlaine, recording "Sky Is a Landfill", "Vancouver", "Morning Theft", and "You and I". Eric Eidel played the drums through these sessions as a stop-gap after Matt Johnson's departure, before Parker Kindred joined as full-time drummer. Around this time, Buckley met Inger Lorre of the Nymphs in an East Village bar and struck up a fast and close friendship.  Together, they contributed a track to Kerouac: Kicks Joy Darkness, a Jack Kerouac tribute album. After Lorre's backup guitarist for an upcoming album quit the project, Buckley offered to fill in. He became attached to one of the songs from the album, "Yard of Blonde Girls" and recorded a cover. Another recording session in Manhattan followed in early 1997, but Buckley and the band were unsatisfied with the material.

On February 4, 1997, Buckley played a short set at the Knitting Factory's tenth anniversary concert featuring a selection of his new songs: "Jewel Box", "Morning Theft", "Everybody Here Wants You", "The Sky is a Landfill" and "Yard of Blonde Girls". Lou Reed was in attendance and expressed interest in working with Buckley. The band played their first gig with Parker Kindred, their new drummer, at Arlene's Grocery in New York on February 9. The set featured much of Buckley's new material that would appear on Sketches for My Sweetheart the Drunk and a recording has become one of Buckley's most widely distributed bootlegs. Later that month, Buckley recorded a spoken word reading of the Edgar Allan Poe poem, "Ulalume", for the album Closed on Account of Rabies. It was his last recording in New York; shortly after, he moved to Memphis, Tennessee.

Buckley became interested in recording at Easley McCain Recording in Memphis, at the suggestion of friend Dave Shouse from the Grifters. He rented a shotgun house there, of which he was so fond he contacted the owner about purchasing it. From February 12 to May 26, 1997, Buckley played at Barristers', a bar located in downtown Memphis, underneath a parking garage. He played there numerous times in order to work through the new material in a live atmosphere, at first with the band, then solo as part of a Monday night residency. In early February, Buckley and the band did a third recording session with Verlaine in Memphis, where they recorded "Everybody Here Wants You", "Nightmares by the Sea", "Witches' Rave" and "Opened Once", but Buckley expressed his dissatisfaction with the sessions and contacted Grace producer, Andy Wallace, to step in as Verlaine's replacement. Buckley started recording demos on his own 4-track recorder in preparation for a forthcoming session with Wallace; some of the demos were sent to his band in New York, who listened to them enthusiastically and were excited to resume work on the album. However, Buckley was not entirely happy with the results and sent his band back to New York while he stayed behind to work on the songs. The band was scheduled to return to Memphis for rehearsals and recording on May 29. After Buckley's death, the recordings with Verlaine and Buckley's demos were released as Sketches for My Sweetheart the Drunk in May 1998.

Death 

On the evening of Thursday, May 29, 1997, Buckley's band flew to Memphis to join him in his studio to work on his new material. The same evening, Buckley went swimming fully dressed in Wolf River Harbor, a slack water channel of the Mississippi River, singing the chorus of Led Zeppelin's "Whole Lotta Love" while swimming under the Memphis Suspension Railway. Keith Foti, a roadie in Buckley's band, remained on shore. After moving a radio and guitar out of reach from the wake from a passing tugboat, Foti looked up to see Buckley had vanished; the wake of the tugboat had swept him away from shore and under water. A rescue effort that night and the next morning by scuba teams and police failed to discover Buckley's body. On June 4, passengers on the American Queen riverboat spotted his body in the Wolf River, caught in some branches.

Buckley's autopsy showed no signs of drugs or alcohol in his system, and the death was ruled an accidental drowning. The official Jeff Buckley website published a statement saying his death was neither mysterious nor a suicide.

Tributes

Elizabeth Fraser of the Cocteau Twins, with whom Buckley previously had a relationship, recorded the Massive Attack song "Teardrop" the day she learned he was missing, and later stated: "That was so weird ... I'd got letters out and I was thinking about him. That song's kind of about him – that's how it feels to me anyway."

PJ Harvey knew Buckley personally. She wrote the song "Memphis" after hearing the news. She had received a letter from him the week before. "There were many things I wished I could say to him, so instead I wrote this song".

Chris Cornell wrote "Wave Goodbye", which appeared on his first solo album, Euphoria Morning, for Buckley.

Rufus Wainwright, whose career had barely started when he met Buckley, wrote "Memphis Skyline" in tribute to him, from his 2004 album Want Two.

Steve Adey's  "Mississippi" from his 2006 album All Things Real contains the lyrics "Until the morning thief steals the humming of the Lord", a reference to Buckley's "Morning Theft".

Duncan Sheik's "A Body Goes Down" paid tribute to Buckley on Sheik's 1998 album Humming, which was included in the documentary Amazing Grace: Jeff Buckley. Drummer Matt Johnson played drums on the track, as well as for Grace and most of Humming.

Glen Hansard wrote "Neath the Beeches" in memory of Buckley; it appears on the album Dance the Devil by Hansard's band The Frames.

Pete Yorn's song "Bandstand in the Sky" from his album Nightcrawler and his live album Live from New Jersey is a tribute to Buckley.

Zita Swoon's song "Song for a Dead Singer" from the album I Paint Pictures on a Wedding Dress is a tribute to Jeff Buckley.

Lisa Germano's "Except For The Ghosts", from the album In The Maybe World, was written for Buckley.

Aimee Mann's "Just Like Anyone", from the album Bachelor No. 2, pays tribute to Buckley.

Juliana Hatfield's song "Trying Not To Think About It", from the album Please Do Not Disturb, was written about the death of Jeff Buckley.

Lana Del Rey's song "Gods and Monsters" is a direct nod to Buckley's former band; Del Rey cites Buckley as an influence.

Caligula's Horse's song "Dragonfly" was described as "a vocal dedication to the music of Jeff Buckley" by Jim Grey (the band's lead vocalist).

Mark Kozelek's song "LaGuardia", from the album Mark Kozelek with Ben Boyce and Jim White 2, includes lyrics detailing Kozelek's memories of Jeff Buckley.

Bono often pays tribute to Buckley and once stated "Jeff Buckley was a pure drop in an ocean of noise".

Katatonia covered his song "Nightmares by the Sea" on their album Tonight's Decision, and their song "Saw You Drown", from their previous album Discouraged Ones, was written as a tribute to his tragic death.

Kevin Morby's songs "A Coat of Butterflies" and "Disappearing" include references to Buckley and his death.

Pianos Become the Teeth’s song "Buckley" references Buckley and his death.

Musical style
Buckley's voice was a particularly distinguished aspect of his music; he possessed a tenor vocal range, spanning around four octaves. Buckley made full use of this range in his performances, particularly in the songs from Grace, and reached peaks of high G in the tenor range at the culmination of "Grace". "Corpus Christi Carol" was sung nearly entirely in a high falsetto. The pitch and volume of his singing was also highly variable, showcased in songs "Mojo Pin" and "Dream Brother", which began with mid-range quieter vocals, before reaching louder, higher peaks near the ending of the songs.

Buckley played guitar in a variety of styles, ranging from the distorted rock of "Sky is a Landfill", the jazz of "Strange Fruit", the country styling of "Lost Highway", and the guitar fingerpicking style in "Hallelujah". He occasionally used a slide guitar in live performances as a solo act, as well as for the introduction of "Last Goodbye", when playing with a full band. His songs were written in various guitar tunings which, apart from the EADGBE standard tuning, included Drop D tuning and an Open G tuning. His guitar playing style varied from highly melodic songs, such as "The Twelfth of Never", to more percussive ones, such as "New Year's Prayer".

Equipment 
Buckley mainly played a 1983 Fender Telecaster and a Rickenbacker 360/12, but also used several other guitars, including a black Gibson Les Paul Custom and a 1967 Guild F-50 acoustic. When on tour with his band, he used Fender Amplifiers for a clean sound and Mesa Boogie amps for overdriven tones. While he was primarily a singer and guitarist, he also played other instruments on various studio recordings and sessions, including bass, dobro, mandolin, harmonium (heard on the intro to "Lover, You Should've Come Over"), organ, dulcimer ("Dream Brother" intro), tabla, esraj, and harmonica.

Personal life
Buckley was roommates with actress Brooke Smith from 1990 to 1991. During a tribute concert to his father, Tim Buckley, in April 1991, Buckley met artist Rebecca Moore, and the pair dated until 1993. This relationship became the inspiration for his record Grace and provoked his permanent move to New York. From 1994 to 1995, Buckley had an intense relationship with Elizabeth Fraser of Cocteau Twins. They wrote and recorded a duet together, "All Flowers in Time Bend Towards the Sun", which has never been released commercially. Buckley began a relationship with musician Joan Wasser, known professionally as Joan as Policewoman in 1994. He reportedly proposed marriage to her shortly before his death.

Legacy 
After Buckley's death, a collection of demo recordings and a full-length album he had been reworking for his second album were released as Sketches for My Sweetheart the Drunk the compilation being overseen by his mother, Mary Guibert, band members and old friend Michael J. Clouse, as well as Chris Cornell. The album achieved gold sales in Australia in 1998. Three other albums composed of live recordings have also been released, along with a live DVD of a performance in Chicago. A previously unreleased 1992 recording of "I Shall Be Released", sung by Buckley over the phone on live radio, was released on the album For New Orleans.

Since his death, Buckley has been the subject of numerous documentaries: Fall in Light, a 1999 production for French TV; Goodbye and Hello, a program about Buckley and his father produced for Netherlands TV in 2000; and Everybody Here Wants You, a documentary made in 2002 by the British Broadcasting Corporation (BBC). An hour-long documentary about Buckley called Amazing Grace: Jeff Buckley has been shown at various film festivals to critical acclaim. The film was released worldwide in 2009 by Sony BMG Legacy as part of the Grace Around The World Deluxe Edition. In spring 2009, it was revealed that Ryan Jaffe, best known for scripting the movie The Rocker, had replaced Brian Jun as screenwriter for the upcoming film Mystery White Boy. Orion Williams is also set to co-produce the film with Michelle Sy. A separate project involving the book Dream Brother was allegedly cancelled.

In May and June 2007, Buckley's life and music were celebrated globally with tributes in Australia, Canada, UK, France, Iceland, Israel, Ireland, Republic of Macedonia, Portugal, and the U.S. Many of Buckley's family members attended various tribute concerts across the globe, some of which they helped organize. There are three annual Jeff Buckley tribute events: the Chicago-based Uncommon Ground, featuring a three-day concert schedule (Uncommon Ground hosted their 25th anniversary tribute in November 2022 ); An Evening With Jeff Buckley, an annual New York City tribute; and the Australia-based Fall In Light. The latter event is run by the Fall In Light Foundation, which in addition to the concerts, runs a "Guitars for Schools" program; the name of the foundation is taken from lyrics of Buckley's "New Year's Prayer".

In 2015, tapes of a 1993 recording session for Columbia Records were discovered by Sony executives doing research for the 20th anniversary of Grace. The recordings were released on the album You and I in March 2016, featuring mostly covers of songs.

In 2012, Greetings from Tim Buckley premiered at the Toronto International Film Festival; the film explores Jeff Buckley's relationship with his father.

Buckley is referenced in the 2001 film Vanilla Sky, when Sofia asks David if he would rather listen to Jeff Buckley or Vikki Carr, to which he responds, "Both. Simultaneously." As David is leaving Sofia's apartment, the music playing is the intro to Jeff Buckley's song "Last Goodbye", from his 1994 studio album Grace.

Matt Bellamy from Muse acquired the yellow telecaster Buckley used throughout his 1994 LP Grace and used it to record new music. In July 2021, a new rendition of Muse's 2009 song “Guiding Light” was released and sold as an NFT ahead of appearing on Bellamy's solo EP "Cryosleep". Bellamy stated: “Jeff’s Telecaster that he recorded the whole Grace album with, and the song ‘Hallelujah,’ has a sound like nothing I’ve ever heard. I had a whole team of people doing due diligence on it to make sure it was absolutely the right one, interviewing his family and all sorts, before purchasing”.

Resurgence
In 2002, Buckley's cover of Leonard Cohen's "Hallelujah" was used in the "Posse Comitatus" episode of The West Wing, for which the audio team received an Emmy Award.

On March 7, 2008, Buckley's version of "Hallelujah" was number one on the iTunes chart, selling 178,000 downloads for the week, after being performed by Jason Castro on the seventh season of American Idol. The song also debuted at number one on Billboards Hot Digital Songs chart, giving Buckley his first number one hit on any Billboard chart.

The 2008 UK X Factor winner Alexandra Burke released a cover of "Hallelujah", with the intent to top the UK Singles Chart as the Christmas number one single. Buckley fans countered this, launching a campaign with the aim of propelling Buckley's version to the number one spot; despite this, Burke's version eventually reached the Christmas number one position on the UK charts in December 2008. Buckley's version of the song entered the UK charts at number 49 on November 30, and by December 21, it had reached number 2, even though it had not been rereleased in a physical format.

Influence 
Musicians who have been influenced by Buckley include Muse, Adele, Bat For Lashes, Lana Del Rey, Anna Calvi, Kiesza, Ben Folds, Jonny Lang, Eddie Vedder, Fran Healy, and Chris Cornell.

Radiohead recorded "Fake Plastic Trees" after being inspired by Buckley's performance at The Garage in London. Speaking about the difficulty of recording the song prior to seeing Buckley, Colin Greenwood remarked “It was going really slowly, so John Leckie said, ‘Why don’t we go out?’ We went to see Jeff Buckley play at The Garage. He just had a Telecaster and a pint of Guinness. And it was just fucking amazing, really inspirational. Then we went back to the studio and tried an acoustic version of ‘Fake Plastic Trees’. Thom sat down and played it in three takes, then just burst into tears afterwards. And that's what we used for the record.” Thom Yorke has said that Buckley's performance gave him the confidence to sing falsetto. 

Coldplay's song "Shiver" was inspired by "Grace". Chris Martin called it "a rip off of Jeff Buckley".

Biopic 
According to Variety, a biopic about Buckley's life, called Everybody Here Wants You, starring Reeve Carney as Buckley, is set to begin filming in autumn 2021. It will be Orian Williams's directorial debut and will be released by Culmination Productions. It will be co-produced by Buckley's mother, Mary Guibert, and Alison Raykovich, manager of Buckley's estate, and will have access to his music.

Discography 

Studio album
 Grace (1994)

Awards and nominations 
 The Académie Charles Cros awarded Buckley the "Grand Prix International Du Disque" on April 13, 1995, in honor of his debut album Grace.
 MTV Video Music Award nomination for Best New Artist in a Video for "Last Goodbye", 1995
 Rolling Stone magazine nomination for Best New Artist, 1995
 Triple J Hottest 100 awarded number 14 best song for that year in the world's largest voting competition for "Last Goodbye", 1995
 Grammy Award nomination for Best Male Rock Vocal Performance for "Everybody Here Wants You", 1998
 Grace was ranked number 303 of the 500 Greatest Albums by Rolling Stone in 2003.
 Buckley's cover of "Hallelujah" was ranked number 259 of the 500 Greatest Songs by Rolling Stone in 2004.
 MOJO Awards nomination for Catalogue Release of the Year for Grace, 2005
 In 2006, Mojo named Grace the number one Modern Rock Classic of all Time. It was also rated as Australia's second favorite album on My Favourite Album, a television special aired by the Australian Broadcasting Corporation, on December 3, 2006.
 Rolling Stone ranked Buckley number 39 in its 2008 list, The 100 Greatest Singers of All Time.
 On the Triple J Hottest 100 of All Time, 2009, Buckley's version of "Hallelujah" was voted third place; "Last Goodbye" was seventh, "Lover, You Should've Come Over" was 56th, and "Grace" 69th.
 On the Triple J Hottest 100 of the Past 20 Years, 2013, Last Goodbye was voted third place and "Hallelujah" number 36.

References

Sources

Further reading

External links 

 
 Amazing Grace documentary
 Jeff Buckley Videos Official Sony BMG music videos
 
 

1966 births
1997 deaths
20th-century American singers
Accidental deaths in Tennessee
American folk rock musicians
American male singer-songwriters
American people of French descent
American people of Irish descent
American people of Italian descent
American people of Panamanian descent
American rock guitarists
American male guitarists
American rock singers
American rock songwriters
American tenors
American writers of Greek descent
Columbia Records artists
Deaths by drowning in the United States
Former Roman Catholics
Musicians from Anaheim, California
People from Greenwich Village
Singer-songwriters from California
Singer-songwriters from New York (state)
Singers with a four-octave vocal range
Musicians Institute alumni
20th-century American guitarists
Guitarists from California
Guitarists from New York (state)
American soul singers
20th-century American male singers